Lgota  is a village in the administrative district of Gmina Tomice, within Wadowice County, Lesser Poland Voivodeship, in southern Poland.

The village has a population of 429.

References

Lgota